Sakarka is a rural locality (a khutor) in Panshinskoye Rural Settlement, Gorodishchensky District, Volgograd Oblast, Russia. The population was 235 as of 2010. There are 7 streets.

Geography 
Sakarka is located in steppe, 46 km northwest of Gorodishche (the district's administrative centre) by road. Panshino is the nearest rural locality.

References 

Rural localities in Gorodishchensky District, Volgograd Oblast